Hal H. Hopson (born 12 June 1933) is a full-time composer and church musician residing in Cedar Park, Texas. He has over 3000 published works, which comprise almost every musical form in church music. With a special interest in congregational song, he continues to make a significant contribution to the new repertoire of hymn tunes and responsorial psalm settings as evidenced by the proliferation of his settings that are included in newly published hymnals and psalm collections.

His cantata, God with Us, was one of the few compositions selected by a panel at the Kennedy Space Center, Washington, DC, to be placed in a capsule during the American Bicentennial in 1976. The capsule will be opened at the Tricentennial in 2076 and will be heard again as a representative piece of American choral composition of this century.

Hal is active as a conductor and clinician, having conducted choral festivals and workshops in United States, Europe, and Asia. More recently he has been recognized for his contribution to music by being included in The International Who's Who in Music, Cambridge, England, and by being awarded the esteemed title of National Patron by Delta Omicron, a national professional fraternity of musicians. He has loved music and composing since a child. He is active in several professional organizations, having served on the national boards of the Presbyterian Association of Musicians and Choristers Guild.

References

External links
 Cyber Hymnal entry

Composers of Christian music
Living people
American Presbyterians
1933 births
People from Cedar Park, Texas